Svalbard, also known as Spitsbergen, or Spitzbergen, is a  Norwegian archipelago in the Arctic Ocean. North of mainland Europe, it lies about midway between the northern coast of Norway and the North Pole. The islands of the group range from 74° to 81° north latitude, and from 10° to 35° east longitude. The largest settlement is Longyearbyen.

 Whalers who sailed far north in the 17th and 18th centuries used the islands as a base; subsequently the archipelago was abandoned. Coal mining started at the beginning of the 20th century, and several permanent communities were established. The Svalbard Treaty of 1920 recognizes Norwegian sovereignty, and the Norwegian Svalbard Act of 1925 made Svalbard a full part of the Kingdom of Norway. The Svalbard Treaty established Svalbard as a free economic zone and a demilitarized zone. The Norwegian Store Norske and the Russian  remain the only mining companies in place. Research and tourism have become important supplementary industries, with the University Centre in Svalbard and the Svalbard Global Seed Vault playing critical roles in the local economy. Apart from Longyearbyen, other settlements include the Russian mining-community of Barentsburg, the Norwegian research-station of Ny-Ålesund, and the Swedish-Norwegian mining outpost of Sveagruva (which closed in 2020). Other settlements lie farther north, but are populated only by rotating groups of researchers. No roads connect the settlements; instead snowmobiles, aircraft and boats provide inter-settlement transport. Svalbard Airport serves as the main gateway.

Approximately 60% of the archipelago is covered with glaciers, and the islands feature many mountains and fjords. The archipelago has an  Arctic climate, although with significantly higher temperatures than other areas at the same latitude. The flora has adapted to take advantage of the long period of midnight sun to compensate for the polar night. Many seabirds use Svalbard as a breeding ground, and it is home to polar bears, reindeer, the Arctic fox, and certain marine mammals. Seven national parks and 23 nature-reserves cover two-thirds of the archipelago, protecting the largely untouched fragile environment.

While part of the Kingdom of Norway since 1925, Svalbard is not part of geographical Norway; administratively, the archipelago is not part of any  Norwegian county, but forms an unincorporated area. This means that it is administered directly by the Norwegian government through an appointed  governor, and is a special jurisdiction subject to the Svalbard Treaty that is outside of the Schengen Area, the Nordic Passport Union, and the European Economic Area. Svalbard and Jan Mayen are collectively assigned the ISO 3166-1 alpha-2 country-code "SJ".

Names 

The name Svalbard was officially adopted for the archipelago by Norway under the 1925 Svalbard Act which formally annexed it. The former name Spitsbergen was thenceforth restricted to the main island. In 1827 Baltazar Keilhau first proposed that the Old Norse toponym , found in medieval Icelandic sources, referred to Spitsbergen. The Icelandic Annals record that  was discovered in 1194, while the Landnámabók places it four s' sailing north of Langanes. Cultural studies academic Roald Berg says  more likely referred to part of Greenland, and the 1925 renaming cemented Norwegian sovereignty as recognised by the 1920 Spitsbergen Treaty (now the Svalbard Treaty).

The name Spitsbergen originated with Dutch navigator and explorer Willem Barentsz, who in 1596 described the "pointed mountains" or, in Dutch, spitse bergen that he saw on the west coast of the main island. Barentsz did not recognize that he had discovered an archipelago, and consequently the name Spitsbergen long remained in use both for the main island and for the archipelago as a whole. Later the main island was sometimes distinguished as West Spitsbergen. The spelling , with z instead of s, derives from German.

Geography 

The Svalbard Treaty of 1920 defines Svalbard as all islands, islets, and skerries from 74° to 81° north latitude, and from 10° to 35° east longitude. All settlements are on Spitsbergen, except the meteorological outposts on Bjørnøya and Hopen. The Norwegian state took possession of all unclaimed land, or 95.2% of the archipelago, at the time the Svalbard Treaty entered into force; Store Norske, a Norwegian coal mining company, owns 4%, Arktikugol, a Russian coal mining company, owns 0.4%, while other private owners hold 0.4%.

As Svalbard is north of the Arctic Circle, it experiences midnight sun in summer and polar night in winter. At 74° north, the midnight sun lasts 99 days and polar night 84 days, while the respective figures at 81° north are 141 and 128 days. In Longyearbyen, midnight sun lasts from 20 April until 23 August, and polar night lasts from 26 October to 15 February. In winter, the combination of full moon and reflective snow can give additional light.

Due to the Earth's tilt and the high latitude, Svalbard has extensive twilights. Longyearbyen sees the first and last day of polar night having seven and a half hours of twilight, whereas the perpetual light lasts for two weeks longer than the midnight sun. On the summer solstice, the sun bottoms out at 12° sun angle in the middle of the night, being much higher during night than in mainland Norway's polar light areas. However, the daytime strength of the sun remains as low as 35°.

The largest glacier is Austfonna on Nordaustlandet, followed by Olav V Land and Vestfonna. During summer, it is possible to ski from Sørkapp in the south to the north of Spitsbergen, with only a short distance not being covered by snow or glacier. Kvitøya is 99.3% covered by glacier.

The landforms of Svalbard were created through repeated ice ages, when glaciers cut the former plateau into fjords, valleys, and mountains. The tallest peak is Newtontoppen, followed by Perriertoppen, Ceresfjellet, Chadwickryggen, and Galileotoppen. The longest fjord is Wijdefjorden, followed by Isfjorden, Van Mijenfjorden, Woodfjorden, and Wahlenbergfjorden. Svalbard is part of the High Arctic Large Igneous Province, and experienced Norway's strongest earthquake on 6 March 2009 at magnitude 6.5.

History

Dutch discovery, exploration, and mapping of a terra nullius

The Dutchman Willem Barentsz made the first discovery of the archipelago in 1596, when he sighted the coast of the island of Spitsbergen while searching for the Northern Sea Route.

The first recorded landing on the islands of Svalbard dates to 1604, when an English ship landed at Bjørnøya, or Bear Island, and started hunting walrus. Annual expeditions soon followed, and Spitsbergen became a base for hunting the bowhead whale from 1611. Because of the lawless nature of the area, English, Danish, Dutch, and French companies and authorities tried to use force to keep out other countries' fleets.

17th–18th centuries 

Smeerenburg was one of the first settlements, established by the Dutch in 1619. Smaller bases were also built by the English, Danish, and French. At first the outposts were merely summer camps, but from the early 1630s, a few individuals started to overwinter. Whaling at Spitsbergen lasted until the 1820s, when the Dutch, British, and Danish whalers moved elsewhere in the Arctic. By the late 17th century, Russian hunters arrived; they overwintered to a greater extent and hunted land mammals such as the polar bear and fox.

19th century 
Norwegian hunting—mostly for walrus—started in the 1790s. The first Norwegian citizens to reach Spitsbergen proper were a number of Coast Sámi people from the Hammerfest region, who were hired as part of a Russian crew for an expedition in 1795. After the Anglo-Russian War in 1809, Russian activity on Svalbard diminished, and ceased by the 1820s. Norwegian whaling was abandoned about the same time as the Russians left, but whaling continued around Spitsbergen until the 1830s, and around Bjørnøya until the 1860s.

20th century

Svalbard Treaty and Norwegian sovereignty 

By the 1890s, Svalbard had become a destination for Arctic tourism, coal deposits had been found, and the islands were being used as a base for Arctic exploration. The first mining was along Isfjorden by Norwegians in 1899; by 1904, British interests had established themselves in Adventfjorden and started the first year-round operations. Production in Longyearbyen, by US interests, started in 1908; and Store Norske established itself in 1916, as did other Norwegian interests during the first world war, in part by buying US interests.

Discussions to establish the sovereignty of the archipelago commenced in the 1910s, but were interrupted by World War I. On 9 February 1920, following the Paris Peace Conference, the Svalbard Treaty was signed, granting full sovereignty to Norway. However, all signatory countries were granted non-discriminatory rights to fishing, hunting, and mineral resources. The treaty took effect on 14 August 1925, at the same time as the Svalbard Act regulated the archipelago and the first governor, Johannes Gerckens Bassøe, took office.

The archipelago has traditionally been known as Spitsbergen, and the main island as West Spitsbergen. From the 1920s, Norway renamed the archipelago Svalbard, and the main island became Spitsbergen. Kvitøya, Kong Karls Land, Hopen, and Bjørnøya were not regarded as part of the Spitsbergen archipelago. Russians have traditionally called the archipelago Grumant. The Soviet Union retained the name Spitsbergen to support undocumented claims that Russians were the first to discover the island.

In 1928, Italian explorer Umberto Nobile and the crew of the airship Italia crashed on the icepack off the coast of Foyn Island. The subsequent rescue attempts were covered extensively in the press and Svalbard received short-lived fame as a result.

Second World War 

Svalbard, known to both British and Germans as Spitsbergen, was little affected by the German invasion of Norway in April 1940. The settlements continued to operate as before, mining coal and monitoring the weather.

In July 1941, following the German invasion of the Soviet Union, the Royal Navy reconnoitered the islands with a view to using them as a base of operations to send supplies to north Russia, but the idea was rejected as impractical. Instead, with the agreement of the Soviets and the Norwegian government in exile, in August 1941 the Norwegian and Soviet settlements on Svalbard were evacuated, and facilities there destroyed, in Operation Gauntlet.
However the Norwegian government in exile decided it would be important politically to establish a garrison in the islands, which was done in May 1942 during Operation Fritham.

Meanwhile, the Germans responded to the destruction of the weather station by establishing a reporting station of their own, codenamed "Banso", in October 1941. This was chased away in November by a visit from four British warships, but later returned. A second station, "Knospel", was established at Ny-Ålesund in 1941, remaining until 1942. In May 1942, after the arrival of the Fritham force, the German unit at Banso was evacuated.

In September 1943 in Operation Zitronella a German task force, which included the battleship Tirpitz, was sent to attack the garrison and destroy the settlements at Longyearbyen and Barentsburg. This was achieved, but had little long-term effect: after their departure the Norwegians returned and re-established their presence.

In September 1944, the Germans set up their last weather station, Operation Haudegen in NordOstLand; it functioned until after the German surrender. On 4 September 1945, the soldiers were picked up by a Norwegian seal hunting vessel and surrendered to its captain. This group of men were the last German troops to surrender after the Second World War.

After the war, the Soviet Union proposed common Norwegian and Soviet administration and military defence of Svalbard. This was rejected in 1947 by Norway, which two years later joined NATO. The Soviet Union retained high civilian activity on Svalbard, in part to ensure that the archipelago was not used by NATO.

Post-war

After the war, Norway re-established operations at Longyearbyen and Ny-Ålesund, while the Soviet Union established mining in Barentsburg, Pyramiden, and Grumant. The mine at Ny-Ålesund had several fatal accidents, killing 71 people while it was in operation from 1945 to 1954 and from 1960 to 1963. The Kings Bay Affair, caused by the 1962 accident killing 21 workers, forced Gerhardsen's Third Cabinet to resign.

From 1964, Ny-Ålesund became a research outpost, and a facility for the European Space Research Organisation. Petroleum test drilling was started in 1963 and continued until 1984, but no commercially viable fields were found. From 1960, regular charter flights were made from the mainland to a field at Hotellneset; in 1975, Svalbard Airport, Longyearbyen opened, allowing year-round services.

During the Cold War, the Soviet Union comprised about two-thirds of the population on the islands (Norwegians making up the remaining third) with the population of the archipelago slightly under 4,000. Russian activity has diminished considerably since then, falling from 2,500 to 450 people from 1990 to 2010. Grumant was closed after it was depleted in 1962.

Pyramiden was closed in 1998. Coal exports from Barentsburg ceased in 2006 because of a fire, but resumed in 2010. The Russians  experienced two air accidents: Vnukovo Airlines Flight 2801, which killed 141 people, and the Heerodden helicopter accident, which killed three people.

Longyearbyen remained purely a company town until 1989 when utilities, culture, and education was separated into Svalbard Samfunnsdrift. In 1993, it was sold to the national government and the University Centre was established. Through the 1990s, tourism increased and the town developed an economy independent of Store Norske and mining. Longyearbyen was incorporated on 1 January 2002, adopting a community council.

Population

Demographics 

In 2016, Svalbard had a population of 2,667 of which 423 were Russian and Ukrainian, 10 Polish, and 322 non-Norwegians living in Norwegian settlements. The largest non-Norwegian groups in Longyearbyen in 2005 were from Russia, Ukraine, Poland, Germany, Sweden, Denmark, and Thailand.

Settlements 

Longyearbyen is the largest settlement on the archipelago, the seat of the governor and the only incorporated town. The town features a hospital, primary and secondary school, university, sports center with a swimming pool, library, culture center, cinema, bus transport, hotels, a bank, and several museums. The newspaper Svalbardposten is published weekly. Very little mining activity remains at Longyearbyen; coal mines at Sveagruva and Luckerfjellet suspended operations in 2017 and were closed permanently in 2020.

Ny-Ålesund is a permanent research settlement in the northwest of Spitsbergen and the northernmost functional civilian settlement in the world. Formerly a mining town, it is still a company town operated by the Norwegian state-owned Kings Bay company. While some tourism to the outpost is permitted, Norwegian authorities limit access to minimize impact on scientific work. Ny-Ålesund has a winter population of 35 and a summer population of 180. The Norwegian Meteorological Institute has outposts at Bjørnøya and Hopen, with ten and four inhabitants, respectively. Both can also house temporary research staff. Poland operates the Polish Polar Station at Hornsund, with ten permanent residents.

The Soviet mining settlement of Pyramiden was abandoned in 1998, leaving Barentsburg as the only permanently inhabited Russian settlement. It is a company town: all facilities are owned by Arktikugol, which operates a coal mine. In addition to the mining facilities, Arktikugol has opened a hotel and souvenir shop, catering to tourists taking day trips or hikes from Longyearbyen.

The village features a school, library, sports center, community center, swimming pool, farm, and greenhouse. Pyramiden features similar facilities; both are built in typical post-World War II Soviet architectural and planning style and contain the world's two most northerly Lenin statues and other socialist realist art. , a handful of workers are stationed in the largely abandoned Pyramiden to maintain local infrastructure and run its hotel, which has been re-opened to tourism.

Religion 

Most of the population is Christian and affiliated with the Church of Norway. Catholics on the archipelago are pastorally served by the Territorial Prelature of Tromsø.

Politics 

The Svalbard Treaty of 1920 established full Norwegian sovereignty over the archipelago. The islands are, unlike the Norwegian Antarctic territories, a part of the Kingdom of Norway and not a dependency. The treaty came into effect in 1925, following the Svalbard Act. All forty-eight signatory countries of the treaty have the right to conduct commercial activities on the archipelago without discrimination, although all activity is subject to Norwegian legislation. The treaty limits Norway's right to collect taxes to that of financing services on Svalbard.

Therefore, Svalbard has a lower income tax than mainland Norway, and there is no value added tax. There is a separate budget for Svalbard to ensure compliance. Svalbard is a demilitarized zone, as the treaty prohibits the establishment of military installations. Norwegian military activity is limited to fishery surveillance by the Norwegian Coast Guard as the treaty requires Norway to protect the natural environment.

Svalbard is not governed by Norway's policies on migration and does not issue visas or residence permits itself. Foreigners do not need a visa or work and residence permits from the Norwegian authorities to travel to Svalbard. However, foreign citizens with a visa requirement for the Schengen Area must have a Schengen visa when travelling to and from Svalbard via mainland Norway.

The Svalbard Act established the institution of the Governor of Svalbard (formerly ), who holds the responsibility as both county governor and chief of police, as well as holding other authority granted from the executive branch. Duties include environmental policy, family law, law enforcement, search and rescue, tourism management, information services, contact with foreign settlements, and judge in some areas of maritime inquiries and judicial examinations—albeit never in the same cases as acting as police. Since 2021, Lars Fause has been governor. The institution is subordinate to the Ministry of Justice and the Police, but reports to other ministries in matters within their portfolio.

Since 2002, Longyearbyen Community Council has had many of the same responsibilities of a municipality, including utilities, education, cultural facilities, fire department, roads, and ports. No care or nursing services are available, nor are welfare payments available. Norwegian residents retain pension and medical rights through their mainland municipalities. The hospital is part of University Hospital of North Norway, while the airport is operated by state-owned Avinor. Ny-Ålesund and Barentsburg remain company towns with all infrastructure owned by Kings Bay and Arktikugol. Other public offices with presence on Svalbard are the Norwegian Directorate of Mining, the Norwegian Polar Institute, the Norwegian Tax Administration, and the Church of Norway. Svalbard is subordinate to Nord-Troms District Court and Hålogaland Court of Appeal, both in Tromsø.

Although Norway is part of the European Economic Area (EEA) and the Schengen Agreement, Svalbard is not part of the Schengen Area or the EEA. Non-EU and non-Nordic Svalbard residents do not need Schengen visas for Svalbard itself, but those travelling via mainland Norway require visas to pass through Norway. People without a source of income can be rejected by the governor.

No one is required to have a visa or residence permit on Svalbard. Regardless of citizenship, persons can live and work in Svalbard indefinitely. The Svalbard Treaty grants treaty nationals equal right of abode as Norwegian nationals. So far, non-treaty nationals have been admitted visa-free as well. While there is no visa requirement, everyone must meet certain requirements in order to stay in Svalbard. These requirements are governed by a separate policy called “Regulations relating to rejection and expulsion of persons from Svalbard”. Among the requirements is that residents must have the means to be able to reside on Svalbard. These requirements apply to both foreigners and Norwegian citizens, and the Governor of Svalbard may reject persons who do not meet the requirements. Russia retains a consulate in Barentsburg.

In September 2010, a treaty was made between Russia and Norway fixing the boundary between the Svalbard archipelago and the Novaya Zemlya archipelago. Increased interest in petroleum exploration in the Arctic raised interest in a resolution of the dispute. The agreement takes into account the relative positions of the archipelagos, rather than being based simply on northward extension of the continental border of Norway and Russia.

Economy 

The three main industries on Svalbard are coal mining, tourism, and research. In 2007, there were 484 people working in the mining sector, 211 people working in the tourism sector, and 111 people working in the education sector. The same year, the mining yielded revenues of 2.008 billion Norwegian kroner (US$227,791,078), tourism 317 million kroner (US$35,967,202), and research 142 million kroner (US$16,098,404).

In 2006, the average income for economically active people was 494,700 kroner, 23% higher than on the mainland. Almost all housing is owned by the various employers and institutions and rented to their employees; there are only a few privately owned houses, most of which are recreational cabins. Because of this, it is difficult to live on Svalbard without working for an established institution.

Since the resettlement of Svalbard in the early 20th century, coal mining has been the dominant commercial activity. Store Norske Spitsbergen Kulkompani, a subsidiary of the Norwegian Ministry of Trade and Industry, operates Svea Nord in Sveagruva and Mine 7 in Longyearbyen. The former produced 3.4 million tonnes in 2008, while the latter uses 35% of its output to fuel the Longyearbyen Power Station. Since 2007, there has not been any significant mining by the Russian state-owned Arktikugol in Barentsburg. The Gruve 7 mine is scheduled to shut down in 2025.

There has been test drilling for petroleum on land, but these did not give satisfactory results for permanent operation. Norwegian authorities do not allow offshore petroleum activities for environmental reasons, and the land formerly test-drilled have been protected as natural reserves or national parks. In 2011, a 20-year plan to develop offshore oil and gas resources around Svalbard was announced.

Svalbard has historically been a base for both whaling and fishing. Norway retains a restrictive fisheries policy in the zone, and the claims are disputed by Russia.

Tourism is focused on the environment and is centered on Longyearbyen. Activities include hiking, kayaking, walks through glacier caves, and snowmobile and dog-sled safari. Cruise ships generate a significant portion of the traffic, including both stops by offshore vessels and expeditionary cruises starting and ending in Svalbard. Traffic is strongly concentrated between March and August; overnight stays have quintupled from 1991 to 2008, when there were 93,000 overnight stays.

Research on Svalbard centers on Longyearbyen and Ny-Ålesund, the most accessible areas in the high Arctic. The Svalbard Treaty grants permission for any nation to conduct research on Svalbard, resulting in the Polish Polar Station and the Chinese Arctic Yellow River Station, plus Russian facilities in Barentsburg.

The University Centre in Svalbard in Longyearbyen offers undergraduate, graduate, and postgraduate courses to 350 students in various arctic sciences, particularly biology, geology, and geophysics. Courses are provided to supplement studies at mainland universities; there are no tuition fees and courses are held in English, with Norwegian and international students equally represented.

The Svalbard Global Seed Vault is a seedbank to store seeds from as many of the world's crop varieties and their botanical wild relatives as possible.

The Svalbard Undersea Cable System is a  fibre optic line from Svalbard to Harstad, needed for communicating with polar orbiting satellites through Svalbard Satellite Station and installations in Ny-Ålesund.

The Arctic World Archive, a huge digital archiving concern run by Norwegian private company Piql and the state-owned coal-mining company Store Norske Spitsbergen Kulkompani, opened in March 2017. In mid-2020, it acquired its biggest customer in the form of GitHub, a subsidiary of Microsoft.

One source of income for the area was, until 2015, visiting cruise ships. The Norwegian government became concerned about large numbers of cruise ship passengers suddenly landing at small settlements such as Ny-Ålesund, which is conveniently close to the barren-yet-picturesque Magdalena Fjord. With the increasing size of the larger ships, up to 2,000 people can potentially appear in a community that normally numbers less than 40. As a result, the government severely restricted the size of cruise ships that may visit.

Unemployment is effectively nonexistent as there is no public assistance.

Transport 

In Longyearbyen, Barentsburg, and Ny-Ålesund, there are road networks, but they do not connect with each other. Off-road motorized transport is prohibited on bare ground in Svalbard, but snowmobiles are used extensively during winter—both for commercial and recreational activities. Transport from Longyearbyen to Barentsburg and Pyramiden is possible by snowmobile in winter, or by ship all year round. All settlements have ports and Longyearbyen has a bus system.

Svalbard Airport, Longyear,  from Longyearbyen, is the only airport offering air transport off the archipelago. Scandinavian Airlines has daily scheduled services to Tromsø and Oslo. Low-cost carrier Norwegian Air Shuttle also has a service between Oslo and Svalbard, operating three or four times a week; there are also irregular charter services to Russia. Finnair operated service from Helsinki, operating three times per week between June and August 2016, but Norwegian authorities disallowed this route, citing the 1978 bilateral agreement on air traffic between Finland and Norway.

Lufttransport provides regular corporate charter services from Longyearbyen to Ny-Ålesund Airport, Hamnerabben, and Svea Airport for Kings Bay and Store Norske. These flights are generally not available to the public. There are heliports in Barentsburg and Pyramiden, and helicopters are frequently used by the governor and to a lesser extent the mining company Arktikugol.

Climate 

The West Spitsbergen Current, the northernmost branch of the North Atlantic Current system, moderates Svalbard's temperatures, particularly during winter. Winter temperatures in Svalbard are up to  higher than those at similar latitudes in Russia and Canada. The warm Atlantic water keeps the surrounding waters open and navigable most of the year. The interior fjord areas and valleys, sheltered by the mountains, have larger temperature differences than the coast, giving about  warmer summer temperatures and  colder winter temperatures.

On the south of Spitsbergen, the temperature is slightly higher than further north and west. Bear Island has average temperatures even higher than the rest of the archipelago.

Svalbard is where cold polar air from the north and mild, wet sea air from the south meet, creating low pressure, changeable weather and strong winds, particularly in winter; in January, a strong breeze is registered 17% of the time at Isfjord Radio, but only 1% of the time in July. In summer, fog is common, particularly off the coast, with visibility under  registered 20% of the time in July and 1% of the time in January, at Hopen and Bjørnøya.

On average, Svalbard has lower humidity than other places in the Arctic Circle. The only places in the Arctic with a lower average are in mainland Norway, Sweden and Finland).

In the same year, the number of days when there was rainfall equalled the number of days when there was snowfall, a significant deviation from the usual pattern whereby there would be at least twice as many snow days.

Global warming has resulted in noticeable climatic changes on Svalbard. Between 1970 and 2020, the average temperature on Svalbard rose by 4 degrees Celsius, and in the winter months by 7 degrees.

As in large parts of the Arctic, the ice–albedo feedback effects can also be noticed on Svalbard: Due to the substantial ice melt, ice surfaces are transformed into open water, the darker surface of which absorbs more solar energy instead of reflecting it back; as a result, these waters heat up and further ice in the area melts faster and faster, creating more open waters, etc. A temperature increase of between 7 and 10 degrees is expected on Svalbard by the end of the century.

Nature 

In addition to humans, three primarily terrestrial mammalian species inhabit the archipelago: the Arctic fox, the Svalbard reindeer, and accidentally introduced southern voles, which are found only in Grumant. Attempts to introduce the Arctic hare and the muskox have both failed. There are 15 to 20 types of marine mammals, including: whales, dolphins, seals, walruses, and polar bears.

Polar bears are the iconic symbol of Svalbard, and one of the main tourist attractions. The animals are protected and people moving outside the settlements are required to have appropriate scare devices to ward off attacks. They are also advised to carry a firearm for use as a last resort. A British schoolboy was killed by a polar bear in 2011. In July 2018, a polar bear was shot dead after it attacked and injured a polar bear guard leading tourists off a cruise ship. In August 2020 a Dutch man was killed by a polar bear at a campsite in Longyearbyen. The polar bear was shot dead. In 2022, a polar bear attacked a French tourist, who suffered injuries to an arm. The bear left after shots had been fired. It was later euthanised following a professional assessment of its injuries.

As of 2021, Svalbard has around 300 resident polar bears. Svalbard and Franz Joseph Land share a common population of 3,000 polar bears, with Kong Karls Land being the most important breeding ground.

The Svalbard reindeer (R. tarandus platyrhynchus) is a distinct subspecies; although it was previously almost extinct, it can be legally hunted (as can Arctic fox). There are limited numbers of domesticated animals in the Russian settlements.

About eighty species of bird are found on Svalbard, most of which are migratory. The Barents Sea is among the areas in the world with most seabirds, with about 20 million individuals during late summer. The most common are: little auk, northern fulmar, thick-billed murre, and black-legged kittiwake. Sixteen species are on the IUCN Red List. Particularly Bjørnøya, Storfjorden, Nordvest-Spitsbergen, and Hopen are important breeding ground for seabirds. The Arctic tern has the furthest migration, all the way to Antarctica.

Two songbirds migrate to Svalbard to breed: the snow bunting and the northern wheatear. Rock ptarmigan is the only bird to overwinter. Remains of Predator X (Pliosaurus funkei) from the Jurassic period were discovered here. It is one of the largest dinosaur-era marine reptiles ever found.

Svalbard has permafrost and tundra, including low, middle, and high Arctic vegetation. One hundred and sixty-five species of plants have been found on the archipelago. Only those areas which defrost in the summer are vegetated, which accounts for about 10% of the archipelago. Vegetation is most abundant in Nordenskiöld Land, around Isfjorden and where affected by guano. While there is little precipitation, giving the archipelago a steppe climate, plants still have good access to water because the cold climate reduces evaporation. The growing season is very short, and may last only a few weeks. The Svalbard poppy (Papaver dahlianum) is the symbolic flower of Svalbard.

There are seven national parks in Svalbard: Forlandet, Indre Wijdefjorden, Nordenskiöld Land, Nordre Isfjorden Land, Nordvest-Spitsbergen, Sassen-Bünsow Land and Sør-Spitsbergen. The archipelago has fifteen bird sanctuaries, one geotopic protected area and six nature reserves—with Nordaust-Svalbard and Søraust-Svalbard both being larger than any of the national parks. Most of the nature reserves and three of the national parks were created in 1973, with the remaining areas gaining protection in the 2000s. All human traces dating from before 1946 are automatically protected. The protected areas make up 65% of the archipelago. Svalbard is on Norway's tentative list for nomination as a UNESCO World Heritage Site.

The total solar eclipse of 20 March 2015 included only Svalbard and the Faroe Islands in the band of totality.

Education 

Longyearbyen School serves ages 6–18. It is the primary/secondary school in the northernmost location on Earth. Once pupils reach ages 16 or 17, most families move to mainland Norway. Barentsburg has its own school serving the Russian community; by 2014 it had three teachers, and its welfare funds had declined. A primary school served the community of Pyramiden in the pre-1998 period.

There is a non-degree offering tertiary educational institution in Longyearbyen, University Centre in Svalbard (UNIS), the northernmost tertiary school on Earth.

Sports 
Association football is the most popular sport in Svalbard. There are three football pitches (one at Barentsburg), but no stadiums because of the small population. There is also an indoor hall adopted for multiple sports including indoor football.

See also 
 Agriculture in Svalbard
 Cape Amsterdam
 List of islands of Norway
 List of islands of Norway by area
 List of northernmost settlements
 Outline of Svalbard
 Svalbard and Jan Mayen
 Noordsche Compagnie
 Svalbard in fiction

References

Notes

Citations

Sources 
 
 
 
 
 
Grydehøj, Adam (2020). "Svalbard: International Relations in an Exceptionally International Territory" in The Palgrave Handbook  of Arctic Policy and Politics. Palgrave.
 
 Roskill, Stephen (1954–56). The War at Sea. Vols I-III.  HMSO. .
  Photo book.

External links 

 Sysselmannen – Governor of Svalbard website
 Svalbard Tourism – official tourist board website

 
Archipelagoes of Norway
Archipelagoes of the Arctic Ocean
Integral overseas territories
Landforms of the Barents Sea
Regions of the Arctic
Subdivisions of Norway
Demilitarized zones
Concession territories
1590s in the Dutch Empire
17th century in the Dutch Empire
Maritime history of the Dutch Republic